This is for the Brazilian town.  For the genus of characid fish see Curimata (fish)

Curimata is a municipality in the state of Piauí in the Northeast region of Brazil

See also
List of municipalities in Piauí

References

Municipalities in Piauí